Russell Lake is a lake in Crow Wing County, in the U.S. state of Minnesota.

Russell Lake was named for T. P. Russell, a pioneer who settled there.

See also
List of lakes in Minnesota

References

Lakes of Minnesota
Lakes of Crow Wing County, Minnesota